Virginia "Pepper" Potts is a fictional character appearing in American comic books published by Marvel Comics. She serves as a supporting character to Iron Man and sometimes a romantic interest of Tony Stark. Created by writers Stan Lee and Robert Bernstein and designed by artist Don Heck, she first appeared in Tales of Suspense #45 (Sept. 1963). In 2007, she joined the Fifty State Initiative under the code name Hera. In 2009, she assumed the identity of Rescue after being given her own variation of a suit of Iron Man's armor by Tony Stark.

The character has appeared in various media adaptations, including video games, animated series, and live-action films. Gwyneth Paltrow portrays Pepper Potts in the Marvel Cinematic Universe (MCU) films Iron Man (2008), Iron Man 2 (2010), The Avengers (2012), Iron Man 3 (2013), Spider-Man: Homecoming (2017), Avengers: Infinity War (2018), and Avengers: Endgame (2019). Beth Hoyt voices an alternate version of the character in the animated Disney+ series What If...? (2021).

Publication history
Virginia "Pepper" Potts first appeared in Tales of Suspense #45 (September 1963), which was written by Robert Bernstein with a story plot by Stan Lee and illustrated by Don Heck. Though she was named Pepper Potts from the start, Stark addresses her as "Kitty" in one panel, which is thought to be a typo. Heck modeled Potts as Ann B. Davis’ character of Schultzy from The Bob Cummings Show, and she is rendered with brown hair done up in a hairdo similar to Schultzy's. Someone on the creative team or in editorial came to feel that the resemblance was too great, and in Tales of Suspense #50, Potts' look was altered to give her red hair and a different hairdo.

Fictional character biography

Early history
Potts is originally a member of a secretarial pool, and gets her job by fixing an accounting error made by Stark. She is depicted initially as being infatuated with Stark, and rejects the advances of Stark's chauffeur and assistant Happy Hogan, who debuted in the same issue, with acerbic remarks. As Stark's affection for her grows in the ensuing issues, she becomes part of a love triangle between the two men, and eventually falls in love with and marries Hogan, eloping with him in Tales of Suspense #91.

Pepper and Happy eventually leave Stark Industries, settling in the Rocky Mountains and then finally in Cleveland, where they adopt children after being unable to conceive, and disappear from the main Iron Man storyline. After being kidnapped by Stark's rival Obadiah Stane, Pepper tells Tony to stay out of their lives. Pepper and Happy soon divorce after she has an affair with a former college boyfriend. After Tony Stark's return from the Heroes Reborn universe, Pepper and Happy join Tony at his new company, Stark Solutions, and once again become core characters. After some time, Happy and Pepper once again became involved and remarry, eventually considering conceiving a child to supplement their adopted children. Stark entrusts Pepper with a special remote that could shut him down. However, Pepper, tortured by the responsibility, is forced to return it, and the trauma causes her to miscarry. Stark is able to deal with the remote, but feels guilty that he has placed her in such danger.

After Happy sustains massive injuries in a fight with Spymaster during the 2006-2007 "Civil War" storyline, Pepper requests that Tony turn off Happy's life support.

The Order
After the events of the "Civil War" story line, Pepper joins the Fifty State Initiative as a member of The Order, a government sanctioned superhero team operating within California. She assumes the moniker of the Greek goddess Hera, and uses advanced computer-hardware and prosthetics to monitor and coordinate the team's missions. Upon the absorption of The Order into the Initiative, Tony Stark offers her a job on the special-projects team at Stark Enterprises, which she accepts.

2008 – present
Pepper Potts resumes her activities as personal secretary of Tony Stark. When Pepper is caught in a terrorist explosion caused by Ezekiel "Zeke" Stane, she sustains multiple internal injuries, including shrapnel wounds, and rendered unable to withstand a prolonged surgery. In response, Tony embeds a strong magnet (similar in appearance to the arc reactor of the movie) in her chest, essentially turning Pepper into a cyborg dependent on keeping her chest magnet engaged to stay alive, as he was once.

Pepper's body is further enhanced with new cybernetics and upgrades to the magnet, which are based on Danny Rand's battery designs, and which afford Pepper new super abilities.

When Tony is blamed for the Skrull invasion of Earth that occurs in the 2008 storyline "Secret Invasion", S.H.I.E.L.D. is taken over by Norman Osborn, replaced with H.A.M.M.E.R., and Stark and Maria Hill are fired, along with all of S.H.I.E.L.D.'s employees. Tony realizes that Osborn is after the identities of superhumans that registered with the government following the passage of the Superhuman Registration Act that occurred during the "Civil War" storyline, which is stored in a database in his brain. Stark decides to go underground with Hill, and to wipe the knowledge in his own brain. Stark makes Pepper the new CEO of Stark Industries, trusting only her to shut down the company in his absence. Pepper discovers a secret room in Stark's office which contains a suit of armor that he made especially for her, which she uses under the name Rescue. Though Osborn has seized all Stark Industries facilities and equipment, Pepper states that all components of her armor are legal and that the design specifications are available to anyone. Despite Osborn threatening her loved ones with prison if she interferes with his search for Tony or attempts any more heroic actions, after being freed she endeavors to find Tony herself. They are reunited in Russia, and consummate a now-sexual relationship, but are subsequently captured and tortured by Madame Masque, who was assigned by Norman Osborn to track Stark down. Stark admits that he had loved Masque in the past, but when pressed to make a choice, with his own life on the line, Tony chooses Pepper. Pepper decides to engage Masque in a physical altercation in order to provide a distraction for Stark to escape.

During the 2009 "World's Most Wanted Storyline" (which ran concurrently with Marvel's company-wide storyline "Dark Reign"), Pepper, after defeating Masque, disguises herself as Masque, infiltrating H.A.M.M.E.R. while presenting the Rescue armor to Osborn as spoils of battle. Pepper reveals herself when she rescues Black Widow and Maria Hill from Osborn's imprisonment, while the Rescue suit uploads a virus into H.A.M.M.E.R.'s computers, taking control of the Helicarrier's armory of suits. They then retrieve the hard drive that Hill was assigned by Stark to get, escaping to give it to Captain America in order to restore Stark's mind. As part of "re-booting" Tony (in a vegetative state), the magnet in her chest is removed and placed into his.

Though Stark's memories are restored from a somewhat years-old backup, he no longer remembers the events of the "Civil War" nor his role in it, its aftermath or his affair with Pepper. Pepper survives the removal of her chest magnet, but demands that a new one similar to Tony's own chest repulsor be re-installed, which is done. Recovered, Stark also gifts Pepper with a new Rescue armor, complete with JARVIS.

During the 2011 "Stark Resilient" storyline, when Justine Hammer and Sasha Hammer use their own armored enforcer Detroit Steel to attempt to sabotage Stark Resilient (Tony's new company) and its design for a repulsor technology-powered vehicle, Pepper joins War Machine in helping Stark, during which Pepper experiences a near-death experience in which JARVIS, masquerading as Happy, gives Pepper a cryptic warning of the future.

In the 2012 storyline "The Future", Pepper returns to her civilian life following her destruction of J.A.R.V.I.S., the artificial intelligence that helped her control her Rescue armor, after its compromise led it to go rogue and attempt to kidnap her. She became engaged to Marc Kumar, a public relations and marketing consultant, but broke off the relationship after he briefly became a supervillain.

After Tony undergoes a moral inversion following a confrontation with the psychic Red Skull, Pepper attempts to oppose his efforts to release Extremis on a large scale with the aid of an A.I. back-up of Tony's mind he created eight years ago in the event of his mind being attacked in such a manner. Although the A.I. concludes that Tony's mind is irreversibly twisted, and is subsequently destroyed by Tony, Pepper states that she bought one of the largest media companies from under him which she will use to destroy his reputation by broadcasting his plans to the rest of the world. She then proclaims that any attempts he makes to create his 'perfect world' will have to be carried out with people fully aware that he is now nothing but a monster.

As part of the "All-New, All-Different Marvel" brand, Pepper Potts has not been seen in the public life. When Tony Stark (who was no longer inverted) had hired Mary Jane Watson to work for Stark Industries, Peter Parker attempted to recruit Pepper to work for Parker Industries. Pepper declined the offer.

Appearing in her Rescue armor following the "Civil War II" storyline, Pepper Potts confronted Riri Williams and her Tony Stark A.I. in an attempt to tell Riri the problems of being a superhero only for them to be attacked by Techno Golem and her Biohack Ninjas. As Riri flees, Pepper fights against Techno Golem and her Biohack Ninjas as Techno Golem tries to get answers from Pepper on how she knows Riri. When Techno Golem's armor breaks and Tomoe tries to attack Riri, Pepper fires her Rescue armor's gauntlets at Tomoe which knocked her out. Upon Sharon Carter formally meeting Riri upon the arrest of Tomoe and the Biohack Ninjas, Pepper states to Riri that they will talk again as she flies off in her Rescue armor. Pepper Potts was present with Mary Jane Watson, Friday, the Tony Stark A.I., and Tony Stark's biological mother Amanda Armstrong when they are in the Hall of Armor where Riri voices her knowledge of each of the Iron Man armors. When Amanda Armstrong offers to have Riri let Tony Stark's labs be her base of operations, Riri is hesitant as Pepper encourages her.

During the "Secret Empire" storyline, Rescue is among the superheroes that are part of the Underground where she is part of their resistance against Hydra following their takeover of the United States.

In the pages of "Iron Man 2020", Tony Stark came to accept that he is an artificial construct of the real Tony and Pepper Potts is among the people who Tony did not return the calls to. Pepper and Bethany came up with a way to rebuild Tony that involves the DNA samples of his parents. As the A.I. Army's rebellion is happening, Pepper is introduced to an off the grid navigation incorporated in the Rescue armor that Tony previously developed before Y2K called H.A.P.P.Y. (short for Host Analogue Program Pre-Y2K) where its personality is modeled after Happy Hogan. Donning the Rescue armor, Pepper flies to England to seek out Tony's biological mother Amanda Armstrong while recalling that his father Jude is a Hydra agent. After Rescue subdues the automated studio equipment at North Star Studios, Amanda is reluctant to give up a DNA sample as she wants Pepper to move on. Following a fight with Hydra drones and receiving aid from the automated studio equipment, Amanda is injured as she gives Rescue her hair sample. While Amanda doesn't know if what is planned is the right thing, she does believe in Pepper Potts.

Powers and abilities
The Stark-tech mag-field generator implanted in Pepper's chest was not weapons-based like Stark's, but borrowed non-weaponized electromagnetic technology from Rand Industries, which caused a number of physical changes to her body. It cured her tinnitus, improving her hearing and her other senses. It allows her to sense electromagnetic fields, and manipulate them to levitate her body. It enhances her strength and durability, and allows her to recover more quickly from injuries.

Armor
Potts' Stark-tech armor suit, which is designated Mark 1616, but named Rescue by Potts, represents a hybrid of repulsor technology and portable electromagnetic super-field generators that give the suit flight, speed, strength, and magnetic-field manipulation. Its electromagnetic force fields are powerful enough to enable Rescue to stop a falling jet airliner without physical contact with it, and can also be used as an offensive weapon with other armored opponents. The suit's physical strength enables it to hold up a stilt mansion felled by an earthquake, and to rip the lower leg of the Black armor. The armor also features an artificial intelligence named J.A.R.V.I.S. that acts as a guide for Potts. During the 2012 storyline "The Future", Potts and Carson Wyche come to suspect that the Mandarin has hacked J.A.R.V.I.S. to spy on Potts, and when they attempt to troubleshoot the Rescue helmet, J.A.R.V.I.S. takes control of the Rescue armor, and takes Potts and Wyche hostage. J.A.R.V.I.S. is disabled by James Rhodes with a source-focused electromagnetic pulse from the Black armor. Potts eventually destroys J.A.R.V.I.S. by placing the Rescue suit's helmet inside an MRI scanner, ending her career as Rescue.

In the subsequent series Superior Iron Man, Potts uses a purple and white Rescue armor armed with sonic disruptors. After the Marvel universe was rebooted in the Secret Wars event, this version of the armor did not appear again. The red Rescue armor that Potts wears when she meets Riri Williams in The Invincible Iron Man  vol. 4 #3 (2017) is based on the Marvel Legends Rescue action figure released in 2015. The Iron Man 2020 event and its Rescue 2020 spinoff depict Potts using a blue Rescue armor based on the one from the film Avengers: Endgame.

Reception

Accolades 

 In 2018, CBR.com ranked Pepper Potts 4th in their "15 Iron Man Armors Ranked Worst To Best (And 5 Who Wore The Armor Better)" list.
 In 2020, Scary Mommy included Pepper Potts in their "Looking For A Role Model? These 195+ Marvel Female Characters Are Truly Heroic" list.
 In 2020, CBR.com ranked Pepper Potts 1st in their "10 Love Interests Of Iron Man" list. 
 In 2022, The A.V. Club ranked Pepper Potts 85th in their "100 best Marvel characters" list.

Other versions
 In the Amalgam Comics Universe, DC Comics' Green Lantern and Marvel's Iron Man are combined to create Iron Lantern. Iron Lantern is secretly Hal Stark, owner of Stark Aircraft, a developer of experimental aircraft. One of his test pilots is Pepper Ferris (an amalgamation of Pepper Potts and DC's Carol Ferris). Like both her DC and Marvel counterparts, she is involved in a love triangle, this time with Stark and his chief mechanic Happy Kalmaku (an amalgamation of Marvel's Happy Hogan and DC's Thomas Kalmaku). When Pepper comes in contact with a mysterious alien gem, she is transformed into Madame Sapphire (a combination of Marvel's Madame Masque and DC's Star Sapphire). Pepper Ferris first appeared in Iron Lantern #1 (April 1997), published jointly by Marvel and DC.
 In the alternate universe of the "Heroes Reborn" storyline, she and Iron Man are lovers, although she can also be seen in a relationship with Happy Hogan. Stark is forced to leave her unexpectedly and without explanation, as his very presence in the universe will endanger her life and the lives of everyone else.
 She appears in the Marvel Zombies universe in Marvel Zombies Return, having just submitted her resignation to Stark, who at this point is a near-useless drunk. However, when the zombie Giant Man initiates an outbreak at Stark International, Pepper and Happy are among the zombified casualties. She is killed by Stark when he vomits a nanite-ridden formula upon her, which dissolves Pepper into a skeleton.
 The Ultimate Marvel version of the character can be seen during Ultimates 2. She and Happy Hogan (with whom she appears to be in a relationship) can be seen monitoring Tony Stark using the Iron Man armor.
 The Invincible Iron Man #500 shows a flashforward 40 years ahead where her (and Tony's) son Howard Anthony Stark and granddaughter Virginia "Ginny" Stark are in an apocalyptic future where the Mandarin has conquered the world. An aged version of Tony Stark defeats the long-time foe with the help of Howard and Ginny but Howard and Tony sacrifice themselves in the process. At the story's close, Ginny buries the two next to Pepper's gravestone.

In other media

Television

 Pepper Potts appears in the "Iron Man" segments of The Marvel Super Heroes, voiced by Margaret Griffin.
 A teenage incarnation of Pepper Potts appears in Iron Man: Armored Adventures, voiced by Anna Cummer. This version's full name is Patricia "Pepper" Potts and is initially unaware of Iron Man's secret identity until she learns it after he saves her life. Later in the series, she eventually learns to use Iron Man's stealth armor, is given her own armor, and becomes Rescue.
 Pepper Potts appears in The Avengers: Earth's Mightiest Heroes, voiced by Dawn Olivieri.
 Pepper Potts makes cameo appearances in Marvel Anime: Iron Man, voiced by Hiroe Oka in the Japanese version and by Cindy Robinson in the English dub.
 Pepper Potts appears in Lego Marvel Super Heroes: Maximum Overload, voiced by Grey DeLisle.
 Pepper Potts appears in Marvel Disk Wars: The Avengers, voiced by Fumie Mizusawa in the Japanese version and Ali Hillis in the English dub.

Film
 An English incarnation of Pepper Potts appears in The Invincible Iron Man, voiced by Elisa Gabrielli.
 Pepper Potts appears in Iron Man: Rise of Technovore, voiced by Hiroe Oka in the Japanese version and Kate Higgins in the English dub.

Marvel Cinematic Universe 

Pepper Potts appears in media set in the Marvel Cinematic Universe, portrayed by Gwyneth Paltrow.
 Introduced in the live-action film Iron Man (2008), this version is Tony Stark's personal assistant and friend who later becomes one of the first people to learn of his work as Iron Man and helps him defeat Obadiah Stane.
 In Iron Man 2, Potts is named the new CEO of Stark Industries and meets her replacement "Natalie Rushman", who she initially distrusts. She also joins Happy Hogan in rescuing Stark from Ivan Vanko and has Justin Hammer arrested for attacking the Stark Expo.
 Potts makes a minor appearance in The Avengers, in which she contributes to the construction of Stark Tower before they convert it into Avengers Tower.
 In Iron Man 3, Potts is kidnapped by Aldrich Killian, who takes her hostage and injects her with the Extremis as part of his scheme to get revenge on Stark. She later uses her Extremis powers to kill Killian before Stark funds a surgery to cure her of Extremis.
 Potts makes a cameo appearance in Spider-Man: Homecoming, in which she and Stark get engaged.
 Potts makes a minor appearance in Avengers: Infinity War, in which she and Stark discuss having children before he is taken by Stephen Strange and Bruce Banner to save the universe from Thanos.
 In Avengers: Endgame, Potts is reunited with Stark. Over the course of the following five years, they go on to get married, have a daughter named Morgan, and live at a lakeside cabin until Stark is recruited by the Avengers to undo the Blip. Potts later joins the Avengers in fighting an alternate timeline version of Thanos and his army before Stark sacrifices himself to defeat them. Potts, Morgan, the Avengers, and their allies subsequently hold a funeral for him.
 An alternate timeline incarnation of Potts appears in the animated Disney+ series What If...?, voiced by Beth Hoyt. In the episode "What If... Killmonger Rescued Tony Stark?", Potts suspects Stark Industries' new COO, Erik "Killmonger" Stevens, of killing James Rhodes and Stark before she is approached by Princess Shuri of Wakanda, who offers an alliance to expose Killmonger. In the episode "What If... the Watcher Broke His Oath?", Potts, Shuri, and the Dora Milaje storm Killmonger's throne room, only to find him gone as he had been recruited by the Watcher to save the multiverse.

Video games
 Pepper Potts appears in the Iron Man film tie-in game, voiced by Meredith Monroe.
 Pepper Potts appears in the Iron Man 2 film tie-in game, voiced again by Meredith Monroe.
 Pepper Potts appears in Marvel Pinball, voiced by Tara Platt.
 Rescue makes a cameo appearance in Strider Hiryu's ending in Ultimate Marvel vs. Capcom 3.
 Rescue appears as a playable character in Marvel Super Hero Squad Online, voiced by Laura Bailey.
 Rescue appears as an unlockable character in Marvel: Avengers Alliance.
 Pepper Potts appears as a non-playable character in Marvel Heroes, voiced by Brett Walter.
 Pepper Potts / Rescue appears as a playable character in Lego Marvel Super Heroes, voiced again by Laura Bailey. 
 Pepper Potts / Rescue appears in Lego Marvel's Avengers, voiced by archival audio of Gwyneth Paltrow.
 Pepper Potts appears in Marvel Avengers Academy. This version is initially depicted as Nick Fury's assistant. On March 20, 2016, Potts as Rescue was made obtainable for a limited time.
 Rescue appears as a playable character in Marvel Puzzle Quest.
 Rescue appears as a playable character in Marvel Strike Force
 Rescue appears as a playable character in Marvel: Future Fight.
 Pepper Potts / Rescue appears in Iron Man VR, voiced by Jennifer Hale. This version is Tony Stark's former assistant who was recently promoted to Stark Industries' CEO.

Miscellaneous
Pepper Potts appears in Marvel Universe Live!.

References

External links
 Pepper Potts at Marvel.com

Female characters in film
Fictional secretaries
Fictional business executives
Iron Man characters
Comics characters introduced in 1963
Characters created by Stan Lee
Characters created by Don Heck
Marvel Comics female superheroes
Superhero film characters